Edwin Olde Riekerink (born 28 September 1961) is a Dutch former professional footballer who played as a midfielder for Sparta Rotterdam and FC Groningen between 1981 and 1994.

His brother Jan was also a professional player.

References

1961 births
Living people
Dutch footballers
Sparta Rotterdam players
FC Groningen players
Sportspeople from Hengelo
Association football midfielders
Footballers from Overijssel